Pidu District formerly known as Pi County or Pixian is one of 11 urban districts of the prefecture-level city of Chengdu, the capital of Sichuan Province, Southwest China. It was approved from the former Pi County by the State Council  on November 24, 2016.

An urbanizing district organized as part of Chengdu, the capital of the province of Sichuan, China. It was formerly known as the source of the best tobacco in Sichuan and is now well known for its doubanjiang, a type of spicy fermented bean sauce.

Geography

History
During the Warring States period, the area of the present Pidu belonged to the state of Shu. In 314BC, it was conquered by Qin, which organized Pi County two years later in 312BC.

In the 19th century, the area was famed for the quality of its tobacco, reckoned the best in Sichuan.

It is now seeking to attract electronics and IT corporations and, in 2015, applied for elevation to urban district status.

Administration
The district seat is Pitong. There are 13 other towns in the district:
 Xipu (犀浦镇)
 Hongguang (红光镇)
 Anjing (安靖镇)
 Tuanjie (团结镇)
 Tangchang (唐昌镇)
 Sandaoyan (三道堰)
 Xinminchang (新民场)
 Huayuan (花园镇)
 Ande (安德镇)
 Tangyuan (唐元镇)
 Deyuan (德源镇)
 Gucheng (古城镇)
 You`ai (友爱镇)

Transport
China National Highway 317
China National Highway 213

Climate

Notes

References

External links
Pidu Government official website on Archive.org

Districts of Chengdu